Wet Sleeve Creek is a  long 2nd order tributary to the Banister River in Pittsylvania County, Virginia.  This is the only stream of this name in the United States.

Course 
Wet Sleeve Creek rises in a pond about 0.25 miles northeast of Callands, Virginia and then flows south and then east to join the Banister River about 0.5 miles north of Banister.

Watershed 
Wet Sleeve Creek drains  of area, receives about 46.1 in/year of precipitation, has a wetness index of 346.31, and is about 51% forested.

See also 
 List of Virginia Rivers

References 

Rivers of Virginia
Rivers of Pittsylvania County, Virginia
Tributaries of the Roanoke River